Wulu may refer to:

Wulu County, Lakes State, South Sudan
Wùlu, 2016 Malian film by Daouda Coulibaly
Wulu (Emperor De) ( 10th century?), ancestor of the Jin dynasty emperors
Emperor Shizong of Jin (1123–1189), personal name Wulu
Wulu, Liaoning, town in Zhuanghe, Liaoning, China
Wulu railway station in Beijing, China